Vanguard Automotive Group was a vehicle rental company based in Tulsa, Oklahoma, USA.

Vanguard purchased ANC Rental, owner of National Car Rental and Alamo Rent A Car. It had a fleet of nearly 300,000 vehicles, mainly from Ford and Chrysler, and operated in over 1,500 locations. In 2007, Enterprise agreed to purchase a controlling share in the company from Cerberus Capital Management. 
A sale to rival Enterprise Rent-A-Car was completed on August 1, 2007, making the combined Enterprise-Alamo-National the largest US car rental operation, ahead of The Hertz Corporation and Avis Budget Group.

References 

Companies based in Tulsa, Oklahoma
Private equity portfolio companies
Enterprise Holdings
2007 mergers and acquisitions
Defunct companies based in Oklahoma